The 1977 Air Force Falcons football team represented the United States Air Force Academy as an independent during the 1977 NCAA Division I football season. Led by Ben Martin in his 20th and final year as head coach, the Falcons compiled a record of 2–8–1 and were outscored by their opponents 296–114. Air Force played their home games at Falcon Stadium in Colorado Springs, Colorado.

Schedule

Personnel

References

Air Force
Air Force Falcons football seasons
Air Force Falcons football